Carleton Macy (1861-1946) was an American stage, screen and vaudeville actor. He appeared in much stage work before embarking on a film career in 1915 with William Fox. He often appeared in vaudeville with his wife, Maude Hall, in an act called "Magpie and the Jay". He later did an act with performer Al Lydell called "Two Old Cronies.

Selected filmography
A Woman's Past (1915)
Destruction (1915)
Gold and the Woman (1916)
 Big Jim Garrity (1916)
 The Scarlet Oath (1916)
Seven Keys to Baldpate (1917)
 The Eleventh Commandment (1918)
Seven Keys to Baldpate (1929)

References

External links
 
Carleton Macy at IBDb.com
portrait of Maude Hall, Macy's wife(NYPublic Library, Billy Rose collection)

1861 births
1946 deaths
20th-century American male actors
Male actors from New York City